The Kentucky Wesleyan College Panthers men's basketball team represents Kentucky Wesleyan College, a private college of less than 1000 students located in Owensboro, Kentucky.  The Panthers, a member of the Great Midwest Athletic Conference (G-MAC), have won eight NCAA Division II championships, most recently in 2001 and dating back to 1966.

Joel Utley was the "voice of the Panthers" from 1962 to 2022 (including all eight championships), broadcasting a play-by-play of all Wesleyan basketball games on local Owensboro radio station WBIO.

Conference play
Kentucky Wesleyan is a charter member of the G-MAC (Great Midwest Athletic Conference) that will begin active competition in the 2013–2014 academic season with 8 current NCAA Division II members and one institution transitioning from the NAIA, giving the NCAA D 2 conference 9 members in its first season of full activation.  KWC will leave the Great Lakes Valley Conference (GLVC) after the 2012–13 academic season. Its basketball team frequently represented the GLVC in the NCAA Division II tournament, winning four national championships in basketball while members of the GLVC. After coming off NCAA probation, the Panthers finished 13–14 in the 2007 season, and participated in the NCAA Division 2 tournament for five straight seasons from 2008 to 2012, and were Regional Runners Up in the 2012 season.

Division II Championship appearances
The Panthers advanced to the Division II championship game six consecutive years (1998–2003), winning in 1999 and 2001; the team later forfeited its 2003 runner-up status after it was revealed they had let two ineligible transfer players play.

In addition, they won six other championships (1966, 1968, 1969, 1973, 1987, and 1990) and were runners-up in 1957. Overall, Kentucky Wesleyan has won eight NCAA Division II National Men's Basketball Championships, which is the most by any NCAA Division II School.

Notable players

Retired numbers
Eight Panthers have had their numbers retired. Seven players and team physician Dr. William McManus:

Three Kentucky Wesleyan basketball players played in the American Basketball Association: George Tinsley, Sam Smith, and Dallas Thornton. One Kentucky Wesleyan basketball player has played in the National Basketball Association: Corey Crowder. Crowder played two seasons in the NBA for the Utah Jazz (1991–1992) and the San Antonio Spurs (1994–1995) and later played 14 seasons in Italy, Spain, France and Israel. He was a key member of the 1990 NCAA Division II National Championship team.  Crowder was a three-time All-American performer, newcomer of the year in the GLVC, two-time GLVC "Player of the Year" and the 1991 NABC "Player of The Year" in Division II, which helped get him elected to the Great Lakes Valley Conference Hall of Fame in 2002.Dazmond Starke 2012-2013, led the NCAA Division II in Field goal % with 67.4%.

Panthers in international leagues

Mohamed Abu Arisha (born 1997), Israeli basketball player for Hapoel Be'er Sheva of the Israeli Basketball Premier League and the Israeli national basketball team

History

Records

 *** 20 wins & 5 losses were vacated from the 2003–04 season and for the 2002–03 season the school had to vacate their NCAA Tournament Appearance, the 5 games of the NCAA tournament, (including their NCAA Div II Runner-Up), along with the GLVC regular season championship.

References

External links